The Chirița is a left tributary of the river Bahlui in eastern Romania. It flows into the Bahlui in Dancu.

References

Rivers of Romania
Rivers of Iași County